The 2022 Louisville Cardinals football team represented the University of Louisville during the 2022 NCAA Division I FBS football season. This was the team's fourth season under head coach Scott Satterfield. The Cardinals played their home games at Cardinal Stadium in Louisville, Kentucky, and competed as a member of the Atlantic Coast Conference (ACC).

Previous season
The Cardinals finished the 2021 season 6–7, 4–4 in ACC play to finish in a tie for fourth place in the Atlantic division. Louisville received an invitation to the First Responder Bowl where they lost to Air Force 31–28.

Schedule

Game Summaries

at Syracuse

at UCF

Florida State

South Florida

at Boston College

at Virginia

Pittsburgh

No. 10 Wake Forest

James Madison

at No. 10 Clemson

No. 24 NC State

at Kentucky

vs. Cincinnati–Fenway Bowl

Rankings

References

Louisville
Louisville Cardinals football seasons
Louisville Cardinals football
Fenway Bowl champion seasons